Gilmer Independent School District is a 4A public school district based in Gilmer, in the U.S. state of Texas.

The district is located in central Upshur County and extends into a small portion of southern Camp County.

In 2009, the school district was rated "academically acceptable" by the Texas Education Agency.

Gilmer ISD operates four schools:
 Gilmer High School (Grades 9-12)
 Gilmer-Bruce Junior High School (Grades 7-8)
Gilmer Intermediate School (Grades 5-6)
 Gilmer Elementary School (Grades PK-4)

History
Like other Texas school districts, Gilmer ISD formerly separated children into different schools on the basis of race. The district, in 1965, established a plan to racially integrate.

Notable alumni
 Kris Boyd, NFL player
 Curtis Brown, former NFL player
 Manuel Johnson, former NFL player
 Blake Lynch, NFL player
 Kenneth Pettway, former NFL player
 David Snow, former NFL player

Athletics

The Gilmer Buckeyes compete in the following sports: Cross Country, Volleyball, Football, Basketball, Baseball, Softball, Track, Tennis, Golf, & Powerlifting

State Titles
Football -
2004(3A/D2), 2009(3A/D1), 2014(4A/D2)
Boys Track -
2015(4A)

State Finalists
Football -
2007(3A/D2), 2012(3A/D2), 2020(4A/D2), 2021(4A/D2)

References

External links
Gilmer ISD

School districts in Upshur County, Texas
School districts in Camp County, Texas